The Repercussions of a Badly Planned Suicide is the debut album from UK metalcore band Johnny Truant.

Track listing
All music written and composed by Johnny Truant. All lyrics written by Olly Mitchell.
 "I Am The Primitologist Mr Robert Sapolsky" – 5:22
 "Consider Us Dead" – 6:52
 "Subtracting The Apex" – 7:01
 "Seven Days At Knife Point" – 4:42
 "Infamy" – 5:01
 "Puparia" – 9:53
 "In The Name Of Bleeding Hearts" – 9:56

Personnel

Band members

James Hunter – bass guitar
Stuart Hunter – guitars
Paul Jackson – drums
Olly Mitchell – vocals

Other personnel

Joe Gibb – mixing, mastering
Stuart Lee – additional vocals on "Seven Days At Knife Point"
Tim Machin – additional vocals on "Consider Us Dead"
Aaron Turner – album cover art

Johnny Truant albums
2001 debut albums
Albums with cover art by Aaron Turner
Undergroove Records albums